Campus Norrköping is located in Norrköping and is one of Linköping University's three campus. The area is located centrally in the city.

External links
Linköping University about Campus Norrköping
Linköping University
 

Linköping University
Buildings and structures in Norrköping